Giorgio Bernardin (24 April 1928 – 28 June 2011) was an Italian professional footballer who played as a defender for Sampdoria, Lecce, SPAL 1907, Internazionale, Triestina and Roma, as well as for Italy B.

After retiring from professional football, Bernardin was involved with the building of a hotel in his hometown of Bonassola.

Bernardin died on 28 June 2011.

References

1928 births
2011 deaths
Italian footballers
U.C. Sampdoria players
U.S. Lecce players
Inter Milan players
U.S. Triestina Calcio 1918 players
A.S. Roma players
Association football defenders